Dybowskia has been cited as synonyms for:
 the genus of grasses Hyparrhenia
 Dybowskyia Jakovlev, 1876: a genus of shield bugs in the tribe Tarisini
 Dybowskiella Waagen & Wentzel, 1886: an extinct genus of bryozoan in the family Fistuliporidae (Class Stenolaemata)

References